This is the complete discography of American glam metal band Dokken. Throughout their career, they have released 11 studio albums, 1 EP, 6 live albums, 9 compilation albums and 36 singles.

Albums

Studio albums

Live albums

Compilation albums

Extended plays

Singles

References

External links
Discography on Dokken's official website

Heavy metal group discographies
Discographies of American artists